Ethel Marion Campbell Hawthorne (1870 – April 16,  1945) was an American painter.

Born in Joliet, Illinois, Hawthorne studied at the School of the Art Institute of Chicago and with William Merritt Chase. She belonged to the Pen and Brush Club and the National Association of Women Painters and Sculptors. In 1903 she married the painter Charles Webster Hawthorne, with whom she had a son, Joseph. The couple's papers are held by the Archives of American Art at the Smithsonian Institution.

Notes

References

1870 births
1945 deaths
American women painters
20th-century American painters
20th-century American women artists
People from Joliet, Illinois
Painters from Illinois
School of the Art Institute of Chicago alumni
Students of William Merritt Chase